Edmunds Center is a 5,000-seat multi-purpose arena at Stetson University in DeLand, Florida, that opened on December 5, 1974. It is home to the Stetson Hatters basketball team. The arena is named after J. Ollie Edmunds, fourth president of Stetson University (1948-1967).

It hosted the 1991 and 1996 Atlantic Sun Conference men's basketball tournaments. Many different celebrities and musicians have performed at the Edmunds Center over the years. Notable performers include comedians Bill Cosby, Jay Leno, Steve Martin, and Steven Wright; country music legends Hank Williams, Jr., and Mel Tillis; The Nitty Gritty Dirt Band; Spyro Gyra; and folk singers Harry Chapin, and Don McLean.

See also
 List of NCAA Division I basketball arenas

References

External links
The J. Ollie Edmunds Center website

College basketball venues in the United States
Indoor arenas in Florida
Sports venues in Florida
Basketball venues in Florida
Sports venues in Volusia County, Florida
Stetson Hatters men's basketball
DeLand, Florida
1974 establishments in Florida
Sports venues completed in 1974